Euphrasia Louise "Fraze" Donnelly (June 6, 1905 – May 20, 1963) was an American competition swimmer, Olympic champion, and former world record-holder.  Donnelly represented the United States at the 1924 Summer Olympics in Paris, where she won a gold medal as a member of the winning U.S. team in the women's 4×100-meter freestyle relay event.  Donnelly and her American relay teammates Gertrude Ederle, Ethel Lackie and Mariechen Wehselau set a new world record in the event final of 4:58.8.

Donnelly was born on June 6, 1905 in Indianapolis to Maurice Donnelly and Sarah Jane McCarthy. She was one of seven children: Maurice, Eileen, Mary, Cecile, Virginia, and Crawford. Fraze (as she was called by her family and friends) was known for her athleticism and quick sense of humor. She later went on to work as an instructor at Saint Mary-of-the-Woods College. On November 1, 1934, she married Bruce Raymond Bungard, a fireman.

See also
 List of Olympic medalists in swimming (women)
 World record progression 4 × 100 metres freestyle relay

References

External links
  Euphrasia Donnelly – Olympic Games results at databaseOlympics.com
  Euphrasia Donnelly – profile at The Blackburn Family Association

1905 births
1963 deaths
American female freestyle swimmers
World record setters in swimming
Medalists at the 1924 Summer Olympics
Olympic gold medalists for the United States in swimming
Swimmers from Indianapolis
Swimmers at the 1924 Summer Olympics
20th-century American women
20th-century American people